Keratin 79 also known as KRT79 is a protein which humans is encoded by the KRT79  gene.

Function 

Keratins, such as KRT79, are filament proteins that make up one of the major structural fibers of epithelial cells

References

Further reading